Bryce William Harding is an American record producer, songwriter, beatboxer, and multi-instrumentalist. Also known by his nickname Mr. Chips, Harding started playing piano at the age of 6 and started playing drums in the fourth grade. He formed his first band by the age of 15 called “We Stand Alone”. He landed a spot as a guest performer with Shania Twain at the Palace of Auburn Hills. He attended Michigan State University and started winning local talent shows for beatboxing.  He formed an original band at MSU called “Eclyptic Blue”. Eclyptic Blue created a following in East Lansing which led to a performance on the Warped Tour at the Pontiac Silverdome. Harding has performed multiple times at the Apollo Theater in New York as a beatboxer.

Harding was tapped to produce sound healing albums for Kate Hart. Harding was the drummer for Soul Divide and played part-time keyboard for Stereo Jane. In 2012, Harding was recognized for his musical contributions by The Kresge Foundation as a Kresge Artist Fellow and awarded an unrestricted grant in the amount of $25,000.
 
Harding has worked with and produced music for SOFI K.  He started working with SOFI K when she was 12. Harding and SOFI K released her first album, LoveHate, on November 6, 2015.

Harding co-wrote and produced the Cinnamon Sky album which was the debut album for Liz Ivory and released on March 27, 2018.  Cinnamon Sky was mixed by Chris Lord-Alge and Adam Hawkins.

Bryce produced and co-wrote the follow up Sofi K album, WAR, which was released on June 11, 2021.  The album brings a “modern Motown” sound to pop music and features songs with a member of The Funk Brothers and Motown legend Dennis Coffey on guitar.  The record was mixed by 11-time GRAMMY winner Mick Guzauski and mastered by Bernie Grundman.

Awards 
2012 Kresge Arts Fellowship from The Kresge Foundation
Second place at Apollo Theater “Show OFF” competition

Discography
Soul Divide, Tell The World (2013) - Drums
Kate Hart, Astral Sounds (2014) – Producer, Co-writer, Instrumentalist
SOFI K, "One Way Ticket" (2015) – Producer, Co-writer, Instrumentalist
SOFI K, "Stars" (2015) – Producer, Co-writer, Instrumentalist
SOFI K, LoveHate (2015) – Producer, Co- writer, Instrumentalist
Liz Ivory, Cinammon Sky - Producer, Co-writer, Instrumentalist
SOFI K, Ice Cream (2019) - Producer, Co-writer, Instrumentalist 
SOFI K, All Beautiful (2019) - Producer, Co-writer, Instrumentalist
SOFI K, Fall Back Down (2020) - Producer, Co-writer, Instrumentalist 
SOFI K, All About the Lights (2020) - Producer, Co-writer, Instrumentalist
SOFI K, WAR (2021) - Producer, Co-writer, Instrumentalist
SOFI K, Coming Back For More (2021) - Producer, Co-writer, Instrumentalist

References

Living people
American beatboxers
American male drummers
American male songwriters
American multi-instrumentalists
American record producers
Year of birth missing (living people)